Marie Lovise Pedersen (16 January 1893 – 27 July 1990) was a Norwegian aided education pedagogue.

She was born in Trondheim to Hans Martinius Pedersen and Christine Elisabeth Andersen, and was a sister of architect Sverre Pedersen and metallurgist Harald Pedersen. She died in Trondheim in 1990.

Pedersen graduated as teacher in 1913, and received further education from the University of Geneva and the University of Zurich. She was teacher and headmaster of the Trondheim school of special education. From 1939 to 1962 she served as director of the Directorate for special schools. She wrote the book Intelligensprøving av barn in 1933, and was co-author of De evnesvake i skole og samfunn from 1946.

References

1893 births
1990 deaths
People from Trondheim
Norwegian schoolteachers
University of Geneva alumni
University of Zurich alumni
Norwegian expatriates in Switzerland
Norwegian expatriates in Germany
Directors of government agencies of Norway